The Sun Odyssey 51 is a French sailboat that was designed by Bruce Farr and J&J Design as a cruiser and first built in 1989.

After introduction the boat underwent some style changes prescribed by Andrew Winch, including an interior redesign.

Also known as the Stardust 525, the design was developed into the International 50 in 1994 and the Sun Odyssey 52.2 in 1995.

Production
The design was built by Jeanneau in France, from 1989 until 1992, but it is now out of production. Fify boats were sold in the first six months of production.

Design
The Sun Odyssey 51 is a recreational keelboat, built predominantly of fiberglass, with wood trim and a cutter rig. The hull has a raked stem plumb stem, a sharply reverse transom, an internally mounted spade-type rudder controlled by dual wheels and a fixed wing keel. It displaces  and carries  of cast iron ballast.

The boat is fitted with a British Perkins Engines diesel engine of or a Japanese Yanmar diesel engine of for docking and maneuvering.

The design has sleeping accommodation for six people, with a double "V"-berth in the bow cabin, a "U"-shaped settee in the main cabin and two aft cabins, each  with a double berth. The  "U"-shaped galley is located on the port side amidships. A navigation station is aft of the galley, on the port side. There are three heads, one just aft of the bow cabin on the port side and two just forward of the aft cabins. The cockpit also has a table that includes a hidden ice box.

Operational history
The boat has been used in the yacht charter role, in a four-cabin configuration, with two cabins aft and two in the bow.

See also
List of sailing boat types

References

External links

Photo of a Sun Odyssey 51 under sail

Keelboats
1980s sailboat type designs
Sailing yachts
Sailboat type designs by J&J Design
Sailboat type designs by Bruce Farr
Sailboat types built by Jeanneau